Carlos Martín may refer to:

 Carlos Martín (poet) (1914-2008), Colombian poet
 Carlos Martín (footballer) (born 2002), Spanish footballer